The Old Lake Placid Atlantic Coast Line Railroad Depot, now the Historical Society Depot Museum of the Lake Placid Historical Society, is a historic Atlantic Coast Line Railroad depot in Lake Placid, Florida. It is located at 12 East Park Street.

The station was completed in 1927, but only served passengers until the mid-1950s. Freight trains continued to use the line until the 1970s. On January 4, 1993, it was added to the National Register of Historic Places.

Gallery

See also
South Central Florida Express

References

External links

Historical Society of Greater Lake Placid
Highlands County listings, Florida's Office of Cultural and Historical Programs

Lake Placid A. C. L. Railroad Depot
Lake Placid
National Register of Historic Places in Highlands County, Florida
Railway stations in the United States opened in 1927
Railway stations on the National Register of Historic Places in Florida
Transportation buildings and structures in Highlands County, Florida
Vernacular architecture in Florida